Alizé Cornet was the defending champion, but lost in the second round to Shahar Pe'er.

Ágnes Szávay won in the final 2–6, 6–4, 6–2 against Patty Schnyder.

Seeds

Draw

Finals

Top half

Bottom half

External links 
Main draw
Qualifying draw

GDF Suez Grand Prix - Singles
GDF Suez Grand Prix - Singles
Budapest Grand Prix